The molecular formula C22H30O4 (molar mass: 358.47 g/mol) may refer to:

 Bolinaquinone
 Canrenoic acid
 Gestonorone acetate, or gestronol acetate
 Tetrahydrocannabinolic acid

Molecular formulas